Dimaranan is a surname. Notable people with the surname include:

Katrina Dimaranan (born 1993), Filipino-American model, actress, television personality, and beauty pageant titleholder
Mariani Dimaranan (1925–2005), Filipino Catholic nun and activist
Zephanie Dimaranan (born 2003), Filipino singer-songwriter